Giulio Sirenio (1553 – 1593) was an Italian philosopher from Brescia.

He was professor of theology and metaphysics at the University of Bologna.

Works

References

1593 deaths
1553 births
16th-century Italian philosophers
Academic staff of the University of Bologna